Tang-e Shur-e Olya (also Romanized as Tang-e Shūr-e ‘Olyā) is a village in Mohammadabad Rural District, in the Central District of Marvdasht County, Fars Province, Iran. At the 2006 census, its population was 36, in 7 families.

References 

Populated places in Marvdasht County